Hypericum cardiophyllum is a species of flowering plant in the family Hypericaceae which is endemic to Turkey, Lebanon, and Syria.

References

cardiophyllum
Flora of Turkey